Pachysphinx is a genus of moths in the family Sphingidae first described by Walter Rothschild and Karl Jordan in 1903.

Species
Pachysphinx modesta (Harris 1839)
Pachysphinx occidentalis (Edwards 1875)
Pachysphinx peninsularis Cary, 1963

References

Smerinthini
Moth genera
Taxa named by Walter Rothschild
Taxa named by Karl Jordan